Shahzia Sikander (born 1969, in Lahore, Pakistan) is a Pakistani-American visual artist. Sikander works across a variety of mediums, including drawing, painting, printmaking, animation, installation, performance and video. Sikander currently lives and works in New York City.

Education
Sikander studied at The National College of Arts Lahore in Pakistan, where she was taught the traditional discipline of Indo-Persian miniature painting. She earned a Bachelor of Fine Arts in 1991. Sikander moved to the United States and attended the Rhode Island School of Design (RISD), earning a Master of Fine Arts in Painting and Printmaking in 1995.

Early work

As an undergraduate student in Lahore, Shahzia Sikander studied the techniques of Persian and Mughal Indo-Persian manuscript painting, often integrating traditional forms of Mughal (Islamic) and Rajput (Hindu) styles and culture.  The traditional form of miniature painting requires equal measures of discipline, gesture and expression in order to execute a careful layering of color and detail. Compositionally, miniature paintings exhibit an extensive display of colorful imagery including, human forms, animals, patterns, shapes, dots and connecting lines. Miniature paintings often engage in contextual complexities such as, religious narrative, scenes of battles and court life.  Sikander has integrated the techniques and forms of traditional miniature painting, relying on the layering of images and metaphor to drive her work. Her forms and figures exhibit a quality of continual morphing as transparent imagery is layered, providing a complexity with endless shifts in perception. Sikander's complex compositions "dismantle hierarchical assumptions and subverts the very notion of a singular, fixed identity of figures and forms."  The increasing approach of continual morphing explains Sikander's relationship to an ever-changing world where opposing societies coalescently interact.

The Scroll, 1992, is a semi-autobiographical manuscript painting. The Scroll Sikander's thesis project at the National College of Arts, includes formal elements of historical manuscript painting. The Scroll portrays scenes of everyday contemporary Pakistani life, including rituals that explore cultural and geographic traditions. Many hues, patterns and incidents appear in The Scroll, identifying Sikander's attention to small detail, muted color palettes, and understanding of architectural elements juxtaposed with the intimacies of domestic culture. The use of perspective is increasingly noticeable, exhibiting a linear movement of composition.  Common concerns of economics, imperialism, colonialism, sexualism and identity are also apparent in Sikander's early paintings.  The Scroll launched what has come to be called the neo-miniature.

Sikander's attention to detail and formalism assist in the contextualization of her miniature paintings, stemming from an interest in labor, process and memory.  Earlier paintings also include elements of Gopi, or the cowherd female devotees and lovers of the deity Krishna in Hindu mythology, while figures of men are depicted as "turbaned warriors."  The Gopi is portrayed in Sikander's early miniature paintings to "locate visual and symbolic forms within miniature painting that have the potential to generate multiple meanings."  Shahzia Sikander's most significant use of Gopi can be seen in a series of drawings and digital animation from 2003, titled Spinn. In the animation the characters multiply and their hair separates from their bodies, creating an abstracted form of hair silhouettes. Sikander explores the relationship between the present and the past, including the richness of multicultural identities. Appropriations for Sikander function to move Indo-Persian artistic traditions into the future. The extraction and abstraction of traditional motifs create endless shifts in perception that challenge the linearity of any colonial or postcolonial narrative.Integrated with both personal and social histories, her work invites multiple meanings, operating in a state of constant flux and transition.

Digital animation

Similarly to her miniature paintings, Sikander relies on the process of layering to create digital animation. Formal elements of technique, layering and movement of the digital animations help to unhinge the "absolute of contrasts such as Western/non-Western, past/present, miniature/scale." Sikander explains her appreciation for the process of layering in digital animation, allowing the narrative to remain suspended and open for reinterpretation. Sikander is very patient with her work, some taking months, even years to finish. Sikander states; "The purpose is to point out, and not necessarily define. I find this attitude a useful way to navigate the complex and often deeply rooted cultural and sociopolitical stances that envelop us twenty-four hours and day, seven days a week."

Performance art and installations

As a female Muslim artist, Shahzia Sikander often had to endure stereotyping among her community. The veil (a scarf often worn by Muslim women) covers the hair and neck and is symbolic of both religion and womanhood. Sikander's miniature paintings often refer to the veil, exploring her own religious history and cultural identity. In a performance piece, Sikander wore an elaborate lace veil for several weeks while documenting the reaction of her peers. Sikander explains that the veil gave her an ultimate sense of security, stating that, "It was wonderful to not have people see my facial or body language, and at the same time be in control and know that they did not know I was acting, and checking their reaction."

Imagines and histories of the traditional Muslim veil occur throughout Sikander's compositions. Her larger works are reminiscent of a centuries-old Indian practice in which women regularly paint figures all over the walls and floors of their houses, using "whole body" gestural movements. Sikander uses large drawings as the basis for her large-scale installations, often requiring months to complete. Nemesis, a site-specific installation at the Frances Young Tang Teaching Museum and Art Gallery, features a jewel-like paintings as small as six by eight inches and two animations. Sikander was commissioned to create two large public art pieces for Princeton University, which were revealed in 2017. One is Quintuplet Effect, a painting on layered glass which can be seen in the Julis Romo Rabinowitz Building. The other is Ecstasy as Sublime, Heart as Vector, a sixty-six-foot-tall mosaic in the Louis A. Simpson International Building.

Exhibitions

Solo exhibitions

Group exhibitions

Awards and fellowships

 1995-1997- Core Fellowship, Glassel School of Art, Museum of Fine Arts, Houston
 1997- The Louis Comfort Tiffany Foundation Award
 1998- The Joan Mitchell Award
 1999- South Asian Women's Creative Collective Achievement Award
 2003- Commendation Award, Mayor's Office, City of New York
 2005- Jennifer Howard Coleman Distinguished Lectureship and Residency
 2005- Tamgha-e-imtiaz, National Medal of Honor, Government of Pakistan
 2006- John D. and Catherine T. MacArthur Foundation Fellowship
 2006- Young Global Leader, World Economic Forum
 2008- Performing and Visual Arts Achiever of the Year award presented by the South Asian Excellence Awards, 2008
 2009- Rockefeller Foundation Bellagio Center Creative Arts Fellowship
 2012- U.S. Department of State Medal of Arts, Art in Embassies (AIE), United States State Department
 2022- Fukuoka Prize Arts and Culture Prize

References

Further reading
 The Global Artist, Article in Pakistan's Daily Times
Biography, interviews, essays, artwork images and video clips from PBS series Art:21 -- Art in the Twenty-First Century  - Season 1 (2001).
 Shahzia Sikander Official website
 Sawhney, Hirsh (Mar. 2004).  Small things considered: Shahzia Sikander is big on miniatures.  Time Out New York, Issue 443: March 25–April 1, 2004.  Obtained October 18, 2006.
 Shahzia Sikander at Kadist Art Foundation
 Desai, Vishakha (Dec. 2000).  A Conversation with Shirin Neshat and Shahzia Sikander.  AsiaSource.  Obtained October 18, 2006.

Pakistani contemporary artists
Pakistani painters
MacArthur Fellows
Pakistani emigrants to the United States
Artists from New York City
Artists from Lahore
1969 births
Living people
National College of Arts alumni
Rhode Island School of Design alumni
American artists of Pakistani descent
American women painters
Pakistani women artists
21st-century American women artists
People from Lahore